As Figueiras is one of nine parishes (administrative divisions) in the Castropol municipality, within the province and autonomous community of Asturias, in northern Spain.

The population is 714 (INE 2006).

References

External links
 Official website 

Parishes in Castropol